The following is a list of common definitions related to power generation.



A

B

C

D

E

F

G

H

I

J

K

L

M

N

O

P

Q

R

S

T

U

V

W

X

Y

Z

References

External links
Stanwell Corporation - Glossary
Australian Energy Market Operator - Glossary

Energy production
Power Generation
Wikipedia glossaries using tables